Ilford Urban District Council Tramways operated a passenger tramway service in Ilford between 1903 and 1933.

History

Ilford Urban District Council started services on 14 March 1903. On 12 April 1905 they took control of the Ilford Hill section of the East Ham Corporation Tramways. On 1 October 1905, they took control of the Barking Town Urban District Council Tramways line from Longbridge Road to Loxford Bridge. On 1 June 1914 they took over the Barking Town Urban District Council Tramways Broadway, Barking Station to Loxford Bridge line.

Closure

The services were taken over by London Passenger Transport Board on 1 July 1933.

References

Tram transport in England
Trams in London
Ilford